An agency cost is an economic concept that refers to the costs associated with the relationship between a "principal" (an organization, person or group of persons), and an "agent". The agent is given powers to make decisions on behalf of the principal. However, the two parties may have different incentives and the agent generally has more information. The principal cannot directly ensure that its agent is always acting in its (the principal's) best interests. This potential divergence in interests is what gives rise to agency costs.  

Common examples of this cost include that borne by shareholders (the principal), when corporate management (the agent) buys other companies to expand its power, or spends money on wasteful and unnecessary projects, instead of maximizing the value of the corporation's worth; or by the voters of a politician's district (the principal) when the politician (the agent) passes legislation helpful to large contributors to their campaign rather than the  voters.  

Though effects of agency cost are present in any agency relationship, the term is most used in business contexts.

Sources of the costs

Professor Michael Jensen of the Harvard Business School and the late Professor William Meckling of the Simon School of Business, University of Rochester wrote an influential paper in 1976 titled "Theory of the Firm: Managerial Behavior, Agency Costs and Ownership Structure". Professor Jensen also wrote an important paper with Eugene Fama of University of Chicago titled "Agency Problems and Residual Claims". These works categories agency costs into three main sources:

 Costs borne by the principal to mitigate the problems associated with using an agent. These costs are generally referred to as monitoring costs. They may include gathering more information on what the agent is doing (e.g., the costs of producing financial statements or carrying out audits) or employing mechanisms to align the interests of the agent with those of the principal (e.g. compensating executives with equity payment such as stock options); 
 Costs borne by the agent to build trust with their principal. These costs are referred to as bonding costs. Bonding costs may include contractually limiting the agent's decision making powers, or increasing the transparency of the agent's decision. In theory, agents will only take on bonding costs where the marginal benefit of these costs are equal to or greater than the marginal cost to the agent. Bonding costs may reduce the steps that a principal will need to take to monitor the agent. Therefore, the agent's acceptance of these costs may produce a higher utility outcome for both parties. In practice, bonding costs are nearly impossible to measure.   
The costs that arise where the agent acts contrary to the best interests of the principal. These are referred to as 'residual costs'.

In corporate governance

The relationship between a company's shareholder and the board of directors is generally considered to be a classic example of a principal–agent problem. The problem arises because there is a division between the ownership and control of the company.  The shareholders appoint the board to manage their asset but often lack the time, expertise or power to directly observe the actions of the board. In addition the shareholders may not be placed to understand of the repercussions of the board's decisions. As such, the board may be capable of acting in their own best interests without the oversight of the shareholders. As is noted by Adolf A. Berle, in his now famous work on company law, this issue is exacerbated in companies where each shareholders has only a small interest in the company. Such diversity in shareholder interests makes it unlikely that any one shareholder will exercise proper control over the board. 

The classic case of corporate agency cost is the professional manager—specifically the CEO—with only a small stake in ownership, having interests differing from those of firm's owners.

Instead of making the company more efficient and profitable, the CEO may be tempted into: 
empire-building (i.e. increasing the size of the corporation, rather than the size of its profits, "which usually increases the executives' prestige, perks, compensation", etc., but at the expense of the efficiency and thus value of the firm);
not firing subordinates whose mediocrity or even incompetence may be outweighed by their value as friends and colleagues;  
retaining large amounts of cash that, while wasteful, gives independence from capital markets;
a maximum of compensation with a minimum of "strings"—in the form of pressure to perform—attached.
management may even manipulate financial figures to optimize bonuses and stock-price-related options.

Information asymmetry contributes to moral hazard and adverse selection problems.

Mitigation of Agency Costs
Much of modern company law has evolved in order to limit the effects of agency costs. Company directors in common law jurisdictions owe fiduciary duties to their company. Notably these duties are not owed to the shareholders, but to the company. This is because the company is the company is, in law, a legal person, separate from its shareholders. Breaches of duty by directors will have the primary effect of causes losses to the company. The fiduciary duty requires the company director to act with due care and skill, in good faith, in the best interests of the company and without conflicts of interest. In some jurisdictions deliberate breaches of directors duties can result in civil or criminal penalties.

However, as director's duties are difficult to enforce without the involvement of a liquidator. This is in part due to the asymmetry of information between the shareholders and the board (as noted above). In addition, as directors shareholders are not generally owed directors duties, they do not having standing to enforce them (but notably, some shareholders may have action in minority oppression). Similar issues arises with respect to obligations under a contract between the director and the company, given the operation of the privity doctrine. Companies, instead, often opt for incentive schemes based on the performance of the company. These schemes provide bonuses to company directors when the company performs well. The director is therefore given an incentive to ensure the proper performance of the company, thereby aligning their interests with that of the shareholders. The costs of paying the bonus is still an agency cost, but the company will profit from paying this cost so long as the avoided residual cost (as defined above), is greater than the bonus.   

Another key method by which agency costs are reduced is through legislative requirements that companies undertake audits of their financial statements. Publicly listed companies must also undertake disclosure to the market. These requirements seek to mitigate the information asymmetry between the board and the shareholders. The requirement to make disclosure reduces monitoring costs, and directors are less able to abuse their position when they will be required to disclose their shortcomings.

Concentrated Shareholders
In jurisdictions outside the US and UK, a distinct form of agency costs arises from the existence of dominant shareholders within public corporations (Rojas, 2014).

Modern Examples
Enron, a U.S. energy giant operated for decades trading large and highly demanded commodities. However, 2001 saw the fall of the giant as a result of poor management, and a deeply rooted principal-agent problem. 

Typically speaking, chiefs and management are paid large salaries in the hope that these salaries deter from participation in high risk business. Yet Enron's board of directors decided to pay its managers in the form of stocks and options. In a very simplistic sense, this meant that managements compensation was pegged to stock performance and would mean any decision they made would be to the benefit of themselves (agents) and principals (shareholders). 

Whilst in theory the concept was sound, it meant that Enron's management could now deceive the markets for their own monetary gain, and they did just that. Higher management decided to take on high debt and risky activities, leaving these transactions 'off the books' and essentially meaning Enron was falsifying information. Enron had reached the point where it was overstating profits by $1.2 billion and eventually lead to its collapse.

In Enron's collapse it also took down its accounting counterpart firm, Arthur Andersen, who were certifying Enron's books to be clean, when they very obviously weren't. In the case of Arthur Andersen again reiterating the power of the principal-agent problem, where the accounting firm (principal) trusts and follows orders from the chiefs (agents), who benefit greatly from the business of a large company like Enron.

The collapse of the two giants shook Wall street, and finance around the globe, leading to Enron's CEO Jeffrey Skilling being sentenced to serve 24 years in prison, as a result of various counts of conspiracy, fraud and insider trading. To this day, the Enron Scandal still remains as one of the key studies of the principal-agent problem.

Another potential example of the agency-cost problem (which also gives rise to questions of corporate social responsibility) arose with respect to the James Hardie Scandal, where James Hardie Industires sought to avoid payment of settlements to those former employees suffering from by asbestos related illnesses. Ultimately, the shareholders were almost unanimous in voting in favor of a compensation scheme for the victims. The interests of the shareholders may have favored funding the compensation scheme earlier than the directors were willing to. This divergence in interest, even where it address an issue of corporate social responsibility rather than strictly monetary concerns, could be considered an example of agency cost.   

Further difficulties may arise where the interests of one shareholder conflicts with that of another. In the legal dispute Dodge v Ford Motor Co, Henry Ford sought to take Ford Motors in a direction that was disagreeable to the one of the minority shareholders, Mr Dodge. Mr Ford's aggressive expansion policies (including his goals of reducing prices and increasing employee wages) were perceived by Mr Ford to be for the long-term benefit of the company, but they prevented dividends being paid in the short term. This was beneficial to long-term shareholders, such as Mr Ford, but Mr Dodge may not have held his shares for long enough to reap the benefit. As such, he brought a successful action in minority oppression in order to force the payment of dividends by the Ford Motor Co. Mr Dodge's inability to receive a dividend without litigation is another example of agency cost.

Bondholders
Bondholders typically value a risk-averse strategy since they do not benefit from higher profits. Stockholders on the other hand have an interest in taking on more risk. If a risky project succeeds shareholders will get all of the profits themselves, whereas if the projects fail the risk may be shared with the bondholder (although the bondholder has a higher priority for repayment in case of issuer bankruptcy than a shareholder).

Because bondholders know this, they often have costly and large ex-ante contracts in place prohibiting the management from taking on very risky projects that might arise, or they will simply raise the interest rate demanded, increasing the cost of capital for the company.

Labour
Labour is sometimes aligned with stockholders and sometimes with management. They too share the same risk-averse strategy, since they cannot diversify their labour whereas the stockholders can diversify their stake in the equity. Risk averse projects reduce the risk of bankruptcy and in turn reduce the chances of job-loss. On the other hand, if the CEO is clearly underperforming then the company is in threat of a hostile takeover which is sometimes associated with job-loss. They are therefore likely to give the CEO considerable leeway in taking risk averse projects, but if the manager is clearly underperforming, they will likely signal that to the stockholders.

Other stakeholders
Other stakeholders such as the government, suppliers and customers all have their specific interests to look after and that might incur additional costs. Agency costs in the government may include the likes of government wasting taxpayers money to suit their own interest, which may conflict with the general tax-paying public who may want it used elsewhere on things such as health care and education. The literature however mainly focuses on the above categories of agency costs.

In agricultural contracts
While complete contract theory is useful  for explaining the terms of agricultural contracts, such as the sharing percentages in tenancy contracts (Steven N. S. Cheung, 1969), agency costs are typically needed to explain their forms.  For example, piece rates are preferred for labor tasks where quality is readily observable, e.g. sharpened sugar cane stalks ready for planting. Where effort quality is difficult to observe, e.g. the uniformity of broadcast seeds or fertilizer, wage rates tend to be used. Allen and Lueck (2004) have found that farm organization is strongly influenced by diversity in the form of moral hazard such that crop and household characteristics explain the nature of the farm, even the lack of risk aversion. Roumasset (1995) finds that warranted intensification (e.g. due to land quality) jointly determines optimal specialization on the farm, along with the agency costs of alternative agricultural firms. Where warranted specialization is low, peasant farmers relying on household labor predominate.  In high value-per-hectare agriculture, however, there is extensive horizontal specialization by task and vertical specialization between owner, supervisory personnel and workers. These agency theories of farm organization and agricultural allow for multiple shirking possibilities, in contrast to the principal-agency version of sharecropping and agricultural contracts (Stiglitz, 1974, 1988, 1988) which trades-off labor shirking vs. risk-bearing.

See also
Principal–agent problem

Notes 

Asymmetric information
Law and economics

fr:Théorie de l'agence